"Who Are You?" is the 16th episode of season 4 of the television show Buffy the Vampire Slayer. Written and directed by series creator Joss Whedon, it originally aired February 29, 2000 on the WB Television Network.

Plot
Note: Buffy's and Faith's names refer to their consciousnesses, rather than their bodies.
Buffy, in Faith's body, is abducted by the Watchers Council's team. Meanwhile Faith, in Buffy's body, gives herself a makeover and heads to The Bronze, where she has ruthless fun at the expense of Spike and Tara. Tara recognizes that something is wrong, and she and Willow perform a spell to find the real Buffy. Faith visits Riley and has sex with him while Buffy escapes the Council's team and heads back to Sunnydale in search of Giles and her friends.

Buffy convinces Giles of her identity with the help of Willow and Tara. Meanwhile, Adam convinces a group of vampires of their superiority and they attack a church. Faith tries to leave town, but after seeing what is happening on the news, goes to the church to help while Buffy does the same. Faith and Riley each kill one of the three gang members, but the leader overpowers Faith. Before he can kill her, Buffy stakes him from behind. They fight, and Buffy, with the help of Willow and Tara's conjured Draconian Katra device, restores herself and Faith to their rightful bodies. Faith subsequently escapes and leaves town, and Buffy discovers that Riley had sex with Faith during the body swap.

Production
In a scene where Faith in Buffy's body tries to seduce Riley, the camera "cut[s] to a medium close-up shot of her leather-clad backside", ostensibly Riley's point-of-view shot. Jason Middleton notes that this is a rare case where the audience's gaze is "positioned in a highly fetishistic relation towards Buffy's body". However, Middleton notes, the show disavows this viewing position by reminding the audience that it is Faith's positioning the body, connoting its "look-at-me-ness"; Buffy herself is disconnected from this image of her body. Riley, with whom the viewer is identified, disavows the shot by appearing confused and taken aback rather than sexually predatory. Middleton concludes this covertly allows "a scopophilic position ... for the viewer, even as the show disavows this position".

Analysis
Gregory Stevenson, in Televised Morality: The Case of Buffy the Vampire Slayer, finds it significant that Faith's moment where she "confesses the truth about herself and begins to experience the weight of moral responsibility" occurs in a church.

In their book discussing existentialism in Buffy, Richardson and Rabb argue that this episode and the previous (intended or not) explore the impact of Sartre's Look - the outside view that causes a person to redefine themselves from the perspective of the Other. Faith can now literally see herself as Buffy sees her. When the real Buffy escapes from the Watchers' Council and challenges Faith, the two fight, and Faith (in Buffy's body) repeatedly punches her own face in a fit of self-loathing, shouting, "You're nothing! Disgusting, murderous bitch! You're nothing! You're disgusting!" According to Richardson and Rabb, "Faith is finally seeing herself as Buffy sees her and is even harder on herself than Buffy has ever been."

References

External links

"Who Are You?" at BuffyGuide.com

Buffy the Vampire Slayer (season 4) episodes
2000 American television episodes
Buffyverse crossover episodes
Television episodes written by Joss Whedon
Fiction about body swapping
Television episodes directed by Joss Whedon
Identity theft in popular culture